Gualeguay may refer to:

 Gualeguay, Entre Ríos
 Gualeguay Department
 Gualeguay River